Meall Greigh is a mountain in the southern part of the Scottish Highlands. With Meall Garbh it forms the north-eastern end of the Ben Lawers range.

References

Munros
Marilyns of Scotland
Mountains and hills of the Southern Highlands
Mountains and hills of Perth and Kinross
One-thousanders of Scotland